3412 Kafka, provisional designation , is an asteroid from the inner regions of the asteroid belt, approximately 6 kilometers in diameter. It was discovered on 10 January 1983, by American astronomers Randolph Kirk and Donald Rudy at Palomar Observatory in California, United States. The asteroid was named after writer Franz Kafka.

Orbit and classification 

Kafka orbits the Sun in the inner main-belt at a distance of 2.0–2.5 AU once every 3 years and 4 months (1,212 days). Its orbit has an eccentricity of 0.10 and an inclination of 3° with respect to the ecliptic.

Physical characteristics 

According to the survey carried out by NASA's Wide-field Infrared Survey Explorer with its subsequent NEOWISE mission, Kafka measures 6.1 kilometers in diameter and its surface has an albedo of 0.231. As of 2017, its rotation period and shape remain unknown.

Naming 

This minor planet was named after Franz Kafka (1883–1924), Austrian–Czech writer of novels and short stories, in which protagonists are faced with bizarre or surrealistic situations. The approved naming citation was published by the Minor Planet Center on 13 February 1987.

References 
 

Bibliography

External links 
 Asteroid Lightcurve Database (LCDB), query form (info )
 Dictionary of Minor Planet Names, Google books
 Asteroids and comets rotation curves, CdR – Observatoire de Genève, Raoul Behrend
 Discovery Circumstances: Numbered Minor Planets (1)-(5000) – Minor Planet Center
 
 

003412
Named minor planets
3412 Kafka
19830110